The Festival Western de Saint-Tite is a major annual event held in September, in Saint-Tite, Quebec, Canada.

Voted "Best Outdoor Rodeo in North America" since 1999, Saint-Tite's festival, now in its 52nd edition, attracts around 600,000 visitors every year.

It developed from a rodeo inaugurated in 1967 to promote the leather industry.
It hosts a major rodeo competition, along with other cultural events.

During the two weeks of competition, the entire town shuts down to accommodate spectators.

History
In 1967, a Saint-Tite company specializing in leather work organized a rodeo as a marketing operation on a local sports ground. The event hosts nearly 6,000  visitors and is so successful that it quickly formed several committees to repeat the experience in subsequent years. The active and voluntary participation of citizens is the basis of the event and contributes to the concretization of the company. Efforts are being made to introduce a professional rodeo and equestrian competitions. In 1968, the parade with animal traction made its appearance. Over the years, several activities are added to the festival, always around a Western theme.

In 1972, large wooden stands are inaugurated for the spectators of the rodeo.

Over the years, the city of Saint-Tite, the festival organization, the city's businesses and citizens have gradually changed the look of the infrastructure to make the city look like a Wild West village.
 

This transformation is visible by the following aspects:

A fountain, near the church, is topped by a sculpture depicting a cowboy riding a wild horse.

A western-style four-sided clock is installed at the main intersection of the city.

Road signs indicating the street names have been modified to make them look western.

The shops often have a permanent exterior decoration to the western style. While some have completely changed the outside of their business, most are content to have stylized the name of their business.

Households can participate each year in a decoration contest from outside their home. While most citizens install fences, poles and colored lights, some create articulated decorations with electric motors or cover their entire terrain with western-style objects.

In 1999, the wooden platforms were demolished to make way for new steel platforms with a capacity of 7,243 places.

The Saint-Tite Western Festival is a non-profit organization whose mission is to produce professional rodeos and activities designed to recreate a country-western atmosphere. While promoting an incomparable atmosphere, the event aims to maximize major socio-economic and tourist benefits within the city of Saint-Tite, the MRC Mékinac and throughout the Mauricie region. All this to obtain a radiation at the international level.

A must-attend country-western event and benchmark in terms of professional rodeo in Eastern North America, the Western Festival of Saint-Tite has carved out a place for itself in its region and its community. Its growth is the result of the work of a large number of passionate men and women.

The Organization's vision is to set the standard for producing rodeos and country-western activities in Eastern North America.

In 2008, the festival attracted 585,581 visitors, including 100,000 for the horse-drawn parade.

Prizes and distinctions 
 2019 : Autorisé à vous divertir, prize given out by SOCAN.

See also

Mékinac Regional County Municipality, Mauricie
Festivals in Quebec
Carnaval, Quebec's most famous festival
Calgary Stampede, western Canada's largest rodeo
Raymond Stampede, Canada's oldest rodeo
Canadian Finals Rodeo

References
 The content of this article has been partially or entirely translated from the existing French Wikipedia article at :fr:Festival western de Saint-Tite; see its  history for attribution.

External links
 Tourisme Mauricie Regional tourist office

Festivals in Quebec
Rodeos
Mauricie
Mékinac Regional County Municipality
Tourist attractions in Mauricie
1967 establishments in Quebec
Recurring sporting events established in 1967
September events